No Remorse is a compilation album by English rock band Motörhead, released in September 1984. The album provides an overview of the band's time with Bronze Records and also includes four newly recorded tracks. It is the final album the band released on Bronze Records, with the new material being the first to feature the band's new line-up of Lemmy, Phil Campbell, Würzel, and Pete Gill.

Recording
After touring in support of their 1983 album Another Perfect Day, guitarist Brian "Robbo" Robertson and drummer Phil "Philthy Animal" Taylor left Motörhead and eventually decided to form a new band called Operator together. It had been Taylor who had suggested Motörhead hire Robertson to replace longtime guitarist "Fast" Eddie Clarke, who left the band after recording 1982's Iron Fist.
In the Motörhead documentary The Guts and the Glory, Taylor explains:

In his memoir White Line Fever Lemmy reflects on Taylor's departure:

Taylor informed Lemmy he was leaving shortly after the hiring of guitarists Phil Campbell, whose band Persian Risk had played shows with Motörhead, and Michael Burston, who had gained a reputation playing in Wiltshire clubs and pubs and received the nickname Würzel after the children's TV character Worzel Gummidge. At the suggestion of Campbell, ex-Saxon drummer Pete Gill was quickly brought in as Taylor's replacement.

Lemmy recalled later that friction between the band and their label, Bronze, began in 1982 with the sudden departure of guitarist "Fast" Eddie Clarke. The label had been unhappy with Robertson's hiring as Clarke's replacement, and with little faith in the band's brand new lineup, a decision was made to release a "greatest hits"-style compilation of the band's earlier material. Lemmy viewed this as an indication that the label were "readying the death knell" for Motörhead, and thus he insisted that the album that would become No Remorse contain some new material.

Between 19 and 25 May 1984, Motörhead's new lineup recorded six songs at Britannia Row Studios in London: "Killed by Death", "Snaggletooth", "Steal Your Face", "Locomotive", and two different songs both called "Under the Knife". The first four of these songs concluded each side of the double album vinyl release. The two versions of "Under the Knife" were released on 1 September 1984 as the B-side of the "Killed by Death" 12" vinyl pressing. Lemmy was tasked with the job of selecting the tracks for the compilation album, and he also provided a commentary about each song.

Release
In addition to the usual cardboard sleeve, the original LPs were also available in a real leather sleeve which had silver on black artwork, completely reworked by Joe Petagno in much finer detail than the original with various differences (such as an iron cross). There was a cassette version released in a leather pouch with wording mimicking the Government Health Warning often found on a cigarette packet, about the contents being potentially damaging to the health. They also did a television advert for the album, which featured a brief medley of several songs before Lemmy's voice was heard to declare, "No Remorse... go out and get it!"

The band promoted the album with their No Remorse – Death on the Road tour, conducted between 24 October – 7 November 1984. They kicked off their tour in the UK by making a famous early morning appearance on the children's TV show The Saturday Starship. Their set, which included "Iron Fist", "Ace of Spades", and "Overkill", was performed in the car park of the Central TV studios, Birmingham, prompting complaints about the noise. On 26 October, the band made a live appearance on the Channel 4 pop/rock music programme The Tube, playing "Killed by Death," "Steal Your Face" and "Overkill." However, the programme credits came up during "Steal Your Face," which faded out as the broadcast concluded. "Overkill" would eventually be broadcast some 20 years later, during a retrospective Best of the Tube TV series.

Motörhead would later record a song called No Remorse, which is on their 2002 album Hammered.

Reception

From contemporary reviews, Don Snowden of The Boston Phoenix declared the album as "a thoughtfully packaged double-album retrospective" that was a "relentless onslaught leaves one more invigorated than enervated" due to songs being short. Snowden concluded that the film "captures and encapsulates its subject in one tidy package. You don’t need to buy another Motorhead album after this one – if the much-bruited hardcore/metal crossover ever comes to pass, No Remorse will prove that Motorhead got there first."

AllMusic review states:

In 2017, it was ranked 7th on Rolling Stone list of "100 Greatest Metal Albums of All Time"; the only compilation on the list. Commenting on this choice for a band that never changed its formula, J. D. Considine said:

Track listing

 The original single CD – issued by Castle (CLACD 121) in the UK, Europe and the rest of the world, and by Roadracer (RRD 9354) in North America – omitted the tracks "Louie, Louie" and "Leaving Here" from the original vinyl and cassette release due to time restrictions. The complete album was reissued in Japan on two CDs in 1991 (TECP-40687/88) and 1993 (VICP-40098~99).

1996 & 2005 reissues
The 1996 Castle and 2005 Sanctuary reissues, which contain all 24 songs, are notable not only for the addition of five bonus tracks, but also for using alternate mixes/edits of certain tracks, as noted below.

 The reissued 2CD versions have included the Stand by Your Man EP done with the Plasmatics, commonly thought of as the reason Clarke left the band. This is the only reissue of the full EP outside its original release in 1982, although "Masterplan" and "Stand by Your Man" have appeared on other compilations.
 The 2015 2LP reissue of the album uses the 1996/2005 mixes, excluding bonus tracks.

Personnel
 Lemmy Kilmister – lead vocals except "Emergency", bass on all tracks
 "Fast" Eddie Clarke – lead vocals on "Emergency", guitar on tracks A1-5, B7, 8 & 11, C1-5, D7-11 – CD2 15, 16 and 17, backing vocals
 Phil "Philthy Animal" Taylor – drums on tracks A1-5, B7-11, C1-5, D7-11 – CD2 15, 16
Denise Dufort – drums on "Emergency"
 Brian "Robbo" Robertson – guitar on tracks B9 and B10
 Michael "Würzel" Burston – guitar on tracks A6, B12, C6, D12, – CD2 13 and 14
 Phil "Zööm" Campbell – guitar on tracks A6, B12, C6, D12, – CD2 13 and 14
 Pete Gill – drums on tracks A6, B12, C6, D12, – CD2 13 and 14

Production
Producers:
 Jimmy Miller – producer (tracks: A4, A5, B11, C1, C3, C4, D7 and D8)
 Vic Maile – producer (tracks: A1, A2, A3, A6, B7, B12, C2, C5, C6, D9, D10, D11, D12 and CD2.13-14)
 Guy Bidmead – co-producer (tracks: A6, B12, C6, D12 and CD2.3-14)
 Eddie Clarke – producer (tracks: B8 and CD2.15–17)
 Will "Evil Red Neck" Reid Dick – producer (tracks: B8 and CD2.15–17)
 Tony Platt – producer, engineer (tracks: B9 and B10)
Engineers:
 Ashley Howe – engineer (tracks: A2 and D3)
 Trevor Hallesy – engineer (tracks: A4, A5, B7, B11, C1, C4 and D2)
 Charles Harrowell – engineer (track: B8)
Cover:
 Joe Petagno – Snaggletooth

Charts

Certifications

References

Sources

External links
 

Albums with cover art by Joe Petagno
Albums produced by Vic Maile
Motörhead compilation albums
1984 compilation albums
Bronze Records compilation albums
Heavy metal compilation albums